The Rumanura famine was a famine that occurred between 1916 and 1918 during the Belgian military occupation of Ruanda-Urundi in World War I when the agricultural cycle of the Mulera region was in its low end and could not provide for the Bugoyi region.

Overview 
In 1916, hostilities in the region caused the Belgian and German troops to clash on Bugoyi Plain. During this a famine broke out and rapidly spread, aggravated by unbalanced rainfalls as well as by feudal coercion. Unlike other famines that had taken place since 1897, the Rumanura famine spread until it eventually covered the whole kingdom.

References

1916 in Africa
1917 in Africa
1918 in Africa
East African Campaign (World War I)
Famines in Africa
20th-century famines